The Reach Foundation (Reach) is a youth not-for-profit organisation established by Jim Stynes OAM and film director Paul Currie in 1994. Reach was created from a desire to inspire every young person to believe in themselves and get the most out of life.

Reach runs national school and community-based programs for young people aged 10 to 18 designed to promote their mental health and wellbeing. Programs are run by the young Reach "Crew" in over 500 metropolitan and regional schools and communities across Australia. The main focus is on prevention and early intervention. Programs aim to identify the underlying reasons for negative behaviour and enable young people to redirect their energy towards more positive outcomes.

Working with teachers and youth professionals
Reach works in partnership with The Commonwealth Department of Education, Employment and Workplace Relations (DEEWR) to offer the Finding Heroes program to teachers, educators and youth professionals.

Finding Heroes is based on the positive psychology framework and aims to provide teachers, educators and youth professionals with the practical skills and resources to improve the emotional and social wellbeing of students.

Working with indigenous communities
Reach works in partnership with DEEWR with the aim of creating relationships with young people in indigenous communities to  encourage them to voice their concerns and aspirations for their lives.

Locations
Reach programs are held at the Reach National Office ("The Dream Factory") in Collingwood (Victoria), Sydney, the Hunter Region (NSW), and in various other locations throughout Australia.

Leadership
Trisha Squires commenced as CEO from 14 September 2015, taking over from Sarah Davies, who took the position in 2011 when Jim Stynes fell ill with cancer.
Anthony Klein began his role as chairman of the board in 2020.

Alumni
Reach Alumni include:
 Jules Lund, TV and radio personality
 Trisha Silvers, 2006 Young Australian of the Year
 Harley Webster aka Phrase, Hip hop MC
 Josh Schmidt Twentysomething (TV series), writer and actor
 Saskia Hempele TV personality, NeighboursNeighbours
 Jess Harris Twentysomething (TV series), writer and actor
 Kayne Tremills ABC3, TV presenter 
 Jordiie Leigh, Filmmaker, What Would You Do Australia

The Open Book Project
The Open Book Project was a national campaign launched by Reach in 2011 that endeavoured to show today's teenagers that they're not alone in their lives. Celebrities and members of the general public shared pages of their teenage diary revisiting the thoughts, feelings and ambitions they had as a teenager.

Celebrity entries  included Hamish Blake, Cathy Freeman,  Kerry Armstrong and Jesse Martin.

References

External links
 Reach website
 Reach on Facebook
 Reach on Twitter
 The Open Book Project

Children's charities based in Australia
Organizations established in 1994